Nova Squadron may refer to:
 Nova Squadron (Terran Confederacy)
 Nova Squadron (Star Trek), an elite precision flight team at Starfleet Academy